Alcona is a railway point and settlement in the town of Sioux Lookout, Kenora District in northwestern Ontario, Canada.

It has a passing track, and is on the abandoned Graham Subdivision main line of the Canadian National Railway, between Thunder Bay at the southeast and Superior Junction on the transcontinental main line at the north; the next point on the line to the north is Superior Junction and to the southeast is Zarn.

Ontario Highway 642 passes through the settlement.

References

Communities in Kenora District